Søby is a Danish surname. Notable people with the surname include:

 Egil Søby (born 1945), Norwegian sprint canoeist
 Frode Søby (born 1935), Danish chess master
 Nina Søby (born 1956), Norwegian former professional racing cyclist
 Tove Søby (born 1933), Danish sprint canoer

Danish-language surnames